The Toronto Argonauts faced the Edmonton Eskimos in the Grey Cup. Although the Argos would hold on to win the game and their 10th Grey Cup championship, an Argo would not sip from the silver mug again until 1983.

Events in Canadian football in 1952 
The Canadian Rugby Union received television revenue for the first time when it was paid $7,500 by CBC for the rights to televise the Grey Cup game. CBLT Toronto was the only station to carry the game live.

The WIFU increased their games to 16 per team.

Regular season

Final regular season standings
Note: GP = Games Played, W = Wins, L = Losses, T = Ties, PF = Points For, PA = Points Against, Pts = Points

Bold text means that they have clinched the playoffs.
Winnipeg has a bye and will play in the WIFU Finals.
The last three Windsor Royals games were canceled, leading to an uneven number of games played. The Royals stopped competing in the ORFU after this season.

Grey Cup playoffs
Note: All dates in 1952

Semifinals

Edmonton won the total-point series by 42–38. The Eskimos will play the Winnipeg Blue Bombers in the WIFU Finals.

Finals

Edmonton wins the best of three series 2–1. The Eskimos will advance to the Grey Cup game.

Sarnia won the total-point series by 65–19. The Imperials will play the Toronto Argonauts in the Grey Cup semifinal.

Toronto wins the best of three series 2–1. The Argonauts will play the Sarnia Imperials in the Grey Cup semifinal.

Grey Cup semifinal

The Toronto Argonauts will advance to the Grey Cup game.

Playoff bracket

Grey Cup Championship

Note: WIFU Semifinal, as well as Eastern Playoff dates are not confirmed, however since [1] the regular season ended October 18 in the West, and November 8 in the East, and [2] WIFU Final dates, as well as Grey Cup date are accurate, it is reasonable to assume the above dates are accurate.

1952 Eastern (Interprovincial Rugby Football Union) All-Stars
NOTE: During this time most players played both ways, so the All-Star selections do not distinguish between some offensive and defensive positions.
QB – Bill Mackrides, Hamilton Tiger-Cats
RB – Hal Waggoner, Hamilton Tiger-Cats
RB – Ulysses Curtis, Toronto Argonauts
RB – Gene Roberts, Ottawa Rough Riders
E  – Red O'Quinn, Montreal Alouettes
E  – Al Bruno, Toronto Argonauts
FW – Bob Simpson, Ottawa Rough Riders
C  – Red Ettinger, Toronto Argonauts
G – Eddie Bevan, Hamilton Tiger-Cats
G – Vince Scott, Hamilton Tiger-Cats
T – Jim Staton, Montreal Alouettes
T – Vince Mazza, Hamilton Tiger-Cats

1952 Western (Western Interprovincial Football Union) All-Stars
NOTE: During this time most players played both ways, so the All-Star selections do not distinguish between some offensive and defensive positions.

1st Team
QB – Jack Jacobs, Winnipeg Blue Bombers
HB – Tom Casey, Winnipeg Blue Bombers
HB – Rollie Miles, Edmonton Eskimos
FB – Johnny Bright, Calgary Stampeders
E  – Rollin Prather, Edmonton Eskimos
E  – Bob Shaw, Calgary Stampeders
FW – Bud Korchak, Winnipeg Blue Bombers
C  – Bill Blackburn, Calgary Stampeders
G – Mario DeMarco, Edmonton Eskimos
G – Jim McPherson, Winnipeg Blue Bombers
T – Dick Huffman, Winnipeg Blue Bombers
T – Buddy Tinsley, Winnipeg Blue Bombers

2nd Team
QB – Frank Filchock, Edmonton Eskimos
QB – Claude Arnold, Edmonton Eskimos
HB – Pete Thodos, Calgary Stampeders
HB – Normie Kwong, Edmonton Eskimos
FB – Ralph McAlister, Winnipeg Blue Bombers
E  – Paul Salata, Calgary Stampeders
E  – Joe Aguirre, Edmonton Eskimos
E – Holland Alphin, Saskatchewan Roughriders
FW – Butch Avinger, Saskatchewan Roughriders
G – Harry Langford, Calgary Stampeders
G – Dean Bandiera, Winnipeg Blue Bombers
T – Martin Ruby, Saskatchewan Roughriders

1952 Ontario Rugby Football Union All-Stars
NOTE: During this time most players played both ways, so the All-Star selections do not distinguish between some offensive and defensive positions.
QB – Jack McKelvie, Sarnia Imperials
HB – John Pont, Toronto Balmy Beach Beachers
HB – Archie McAffer, Sarnia Imperials
HB – John Duchene, Sarnia Imperials
E  – Fred Smale, Toronto Balmy Beach Beachers
E  – Jack Glendenning, Sarnia Imperials
FW – John Florence, Sarnia Imperials
C  – Bruce Mattingly, Sarnia Imperials
G  – Bob O'Ree, Toronto Balmy Beach Beachers
G  – Wally McIntosh, Sarnia Imperials
T  – Oatten Fisher, Toronto Balmy Beach Beachers
T  – Maurice Dorocke, Sarnia Imperials
T  – Lloyd "Dutch" Davey, Sarnia Imperials

1952 Canadian Football Awards
 Jeff Russel Memorial Trophy (IRFU MVP) – Vince Mazza (OT), Hamilton Tiger-Cats
 Jeff Nicklin Memorial Trophy (WIFU MVP) - Jack Jacobs (QB), Winnipeg Blue Bombers
 Gruen Trophy (IRFU Rookie of the Year) - John Fedosoff (RB), Toronto Argonauts
 Dr. Beattie Martin Trophy (WIFU Rookie of the Year) - Lorne Benson (FB), Winnipeg Blue Bombers
 Imperial Oil Trophy (ORFU MVP) - John Pont - Toronto Balmy Beach Beachers

References

 
Canadian Football League seasons